The South African Figure Skating Championships are held annually to determine the top skaters in South Africa. The event is organized by the South African Figure Skating Association. Skaters compete in the disciplines of men's singles, ladies' singles, pair skating, ice dancing, and synchronized skating, however, not all disciplines have been held in every year due to a lack of competitors. The levels of competition are Juvenile through Senior, as well as age groups. South African nationals were first held in 1947.

Medalists

Men

Ladies

References
 2001 Nationals
 2002 Nationals
  
 2004 Nationals
 2006 Nationals
 2007 Nationals
 2014 Nationals
 2015 Nationals

External links
 South African Figure Skating Association

 
Figure skating national championships
Figure skating in South Africa